In mathematics, Kolmogorov's normability criterion is a theorem that provides a necessary and sufficient condition for a topological vector space to be ; that is, for the existence of a norm on the space that generates the given topology. The normability criterion can be seen as a result in same vein as the Nagata–Smirnov metrization theorem and Bing metrization theorem, which gives a necessary and sufficient condition for a topological space to be metrizable.  The result was proved by the Russian mathematician Andrey Nikolayevich Kolmogorov in 1934.

Statement of the theorem

Because translation (that is, vector addition) by a constant preserves the convexity, boundedness, and openness of sets, the words "of the origin" can be replaced with "of some point" or even with "of every point".

Definitions

It may be helpful to first recall the following terms:
 A  (TVS) is a vector space  equipped with a topology  such that the vector space operations of scalar multiplication and vector addition are continuous.
 A topological vector space  is called  if there is a norm  on  such that the open balls of the norm  generate the given topology   (Note well that a given normable topological vector space might admit multiple such norms.)
 A subset  of a vector space  is a  if, for any two points  the line segment joining them lies wholly within  that is, for all  

See also

References

Theorems in functional analysis